The 2019 Japanese imperial transition occurred on 30 April 2019 when the then 85-year-old Emperor Akihito of Japan abdicated from the Chrysanthemum Throne after reigning for 30 years, becoming the first Emperor of Japan to do so since 1817. This marked the end of the Heisei era and the inception of the Reiwa era, and saw numerous festivities leading up to the accession of his son and successor, Emperor Naruhito. The Enthronement Ceremony took place on 22 October 2019. Akihito's younger son, Prince Akishino, is his brother's heir presumptive. The ceremony cost 16.6 billion Yen.

Emperor and Constitution

Background 
In 2010, Emperor Akihito informed his advisory council that he would eventually like to retire from his position. However, no action was taken by senior members of the Imperial Household Agency.

On 13 July 2016, national broadcaster NHK reported that the Emperor wished to abdicate in favour of his elder son Crown Prince Naruhito within a few years.

Senior officials within the Imperial Household Agency denied that there was any official plan for the monarch to abdicate. A potential abdication by the Emperor would require an amendment to the Imperial Household Law, which has no provisions for such a move.

National speech 
On 8 August 2016, the Emperor gave a rare televised address, where he emphasized his advanced age and declining health; this address was interpreted as an implication of his intention to abdicate.

Legislation 

With the intention of the abdication now known, the Cabinet Office appointed Yasuhiko Nishimura as the Imperial Household Agency's Vice Grand Steward. In October 2016, the Cabinet Office appointed a panel of experts to debate the Emperor's abdication.

In January 2017, the Lower House Budget committee began informally debating the constitutional nature of the abdication.

On 19 May 2017, the bill that would allow Akihito to abdicate was issued by the Cabinet of Japan. On 8 June 2017, the National Diet passed it into law, permitting the government to begin arranging the process of handing over the position to Crown Prince Naruhito. This meant the Imperial Household Law was changed for the first time since 1949. The abdication officially occurred on 30 April 2019.

Imperial Household Council 
On 1 December 2017, the Imperial Household Council, which had not met in 24 years, did so in order to schedule the ceremonies involved in the first such transfer of power in two centuries.

The Imperial Household Council consists of the prime minister, the speaker and vice-speaker of the House of Representatives, the president and vice-president of the House of Councillors, the grand steward of the Imperial Household Agency, the chief justice and one justice of the Supreme Court, and two members of the Imperial family. Prince Akishino, the Emperor's younger son, asked to recuse himself as he would become the next Crown Prince. He was replaced by Prince Hitachi, the Emperor's 82-year-old younger brother.  The other member of the imperial family was Hitachi's wife, Princess Hanako.

Chief Cabinet Secretary Yoshihide Suga told reporters that the date was chosen to permit the old Emperor to be able to preside over the 30th anniversary Jubilee and to coincide with the Golden Week annual holiday period, turning the changeover from a period of mourning and makeshift ceremonial into a joyous, well-planned festival.

Finally, on 8 December 2017, the government created a special committee to oversee the events. According to Yoshihide Suga: "It will deal with the matter properly, taking into consideration the possible impact on the people's lives."

Preparations for the imperial transition, 2017–2019 
The committee met for the first time in January 2018, and the following month announced that a plan called a "basic policy statement," would be released on 3 April. Official farewell celebrations began with a 30th Jubilee ceremony on 12 February 2019, a delay which would avoid any implication of a celebration of the death of the Emperor Shōwa on 7 January.

Golden Week, 2019 
The government consolidated the Golden Week into a special ten-day holiday block lasting from 27 April to 6 May. Even without the imperial transition, 29 April and 3–6 May were scheduled as national holidays in 2019, following the weekend of 27–28 April. To mark the imperial transition, the government determined that abdication and enthronement would both be national holidays. Japanese law states that a regular work day sandwiched between two national holidays becomes a public holiday.

Calendars 

Since the Meiji Restoration in 1867, a new Japanese Era starts the day after the old emperor dies. However, in Emperor Akihito's case, manufacturers of calendars, forms, and other paper products needed to know the new Era's name in advance to produce wares in a timely manner.

While the Era names for the Shōwa and Heisei eras were kept state secrets until the deaths of the previous emperors, that was not possible in this case, because an abdication is unprecedented since the 1889 Meiji Constitution was adopted. In order to prevent divisive debate on the subject, delaying the announcement as late as is practically possible, either the old Emperor's birthday or his Jubilee celebrations had been suggested.

Until the Era name became known, computers and software manufacturers needed to test their systems before the transition in order to ensure that the new era will be handled correctly by their software. Some systems provided test mechanisms to simulate a new era ahead of time.

The new Era name, was revealed on 1 April 2019 by Chief Cabinet Secretary Yoshihide Suga during a televised press conference.

Enthronement Ceremony 

The Enthronement Ceremony for Emperor Naruhito took place in Tokyo on 22 October 2019, marking the end of the transition period. It was an extra holiday. It was attended by current and former Japanese politicians and more than 3,000 other official guests, which included more than 120 heads of state and government, as well as high-profile delegates from about 210 countries and territories and 9 organizations (the only country not to be invited to this ceremony was Syria).

The Enthronement Ceremony began at 9 am local time (02:00 UTC) with the private "Kashikodokoro-Omae-no-gi" ritual when the Emperor, dressed in white traditional court wear, visited "Kashikodokoro," the main sanctuary in the Tokyo Imperial Palace where the Sun Goddess is said to be enshrined.

At 1 pm local time (06:00 UTC), the main ceremony began. In the ceremony, Emperor Naruhito wore the sokutai and Empress Masako wore the jūnihitoe. He then took his place on the 6.5-metre (21-foot) Takamikura throne alongside Masako at the Matsu-no-Ma (Pine Hall), and gave a speech which emphasized his role as the symbol of the State. The speech then followed by a congratulatory speech by Prime Minister Shinzō Abe and three cheers of banzai.

Japanese Imperial Family
 The Empress, the Emperor's wife and consort
 The Prince and Princess Akishino, the Emperor's brother and sister-in-law
 Princess Mako of Akishino, the Emperor's niece
 Princess Kako of Akishino, the Emperor's niece
 The Former Princess Nori and Yoshiki Kuroda, the Emperor's sister and brother-in-law
 The Prince and Princess Hitachi, the Emperor's paternal uncle and aunt
 The Former Princess Yori, the Emperor's paternal aunt
 The Former Princess Suga and Hisanaga Shimazu, the Emperor's paternal aunt and uncle
 The Prince Mikasa's family:
 Princess Tomohito of Mikasa, widow of the Emperor's first cousin, once removed
 Princess Akiko of Mikasa, the Emperor's second cousin
 Princess Yōko of Mikasa, the Emperor's second cousin
 The Princess Takamado, widow of the Emperor's first cousin, once removed
 Princess Tsuguko of Takamado, the Emperor's second cousin
 Former Princess Noriko of Takamado, the Emperor's second cousin
 Former Princess Ayako of Takamado and Kei Moriya, the Emperor's second cousin and her husband
 Former Princess Yasuko of Mikasa and Tadateru Konoe, the Emperor's first cousin, once removed and her husband
 Former Princess Masako of Mikasa and Masayuki Sen, the Emperor's first cousin, once removed and her husband

Absentees
 The Emperor Emeritus and Empress Emerita, the Emperor's parents
 The Princess Toshi, the Emperor and Empress's daughter
 Prince Hisahito of Akishino, the Emperor's nephew
 The Princess Mikasa, the Emperor's paternal grandaunt by marriage

Officials and dignitaries 
The enthronement was attended by nearly 600 foreign delegates. They included 15 kings, 7 queens, 4 princesses, 11 princes, 70 presidents, 6 governors-general, 27 premiers, 2 chancellors, 10 vice presidents, 6 deputy premiers, 9 former leaders, 38 national officials (which featured 18 foreign ministers) and 9 multilateral dignitaries.

The guests were hosted at the Hotel New Otani in Tokyo, and a state banquet hosted by Emperor Naruhito himself was organized later in the day.

The ceremony was considered to be one of the "largest gathering of world leaders" in the contemporary world's and Japan's history.

Post-enthronement ceremony

Parade 
A Parade to celebrate the Naruhito's enthronement as a new emperor took place on 10 November at 3 pm local time (06:00 UTC) as tens of thousands of people gathered in the city centre of Tokyo waving the Japanese flag. Toyota Century convertible, which the couple used was followed by vehicles with Crown Prince Fumihito and his wife Crown Princess Kiko as well as Shinzō Abe.

The procession forming a 400-metre motorcade was started from Tokyo Imperial Palace, passed the Tokyo Metropolitan Police Department and the main gate of the Diet building before arriving at the couple's residence in the Akasaka Imperial Grounds on the 4.6-kilometre-long (3-mile-long) route.

Timeline 

Heisei Era

2010 
Emperor Akihito informs his advisory council that he would like to retire eventually and asks for their help in arranging this.

2016 
 July: Emperor Akihito leaks to the press his wishes to retire.
 13 July: NHK reports his wishes to the public.
 8 August: The Emperor makes address to the public on television and radio implying the above wish.
 September: Prime Minister Shinzō Abe appoints a committee to investigate the legal ramifications of a possible abdication.

2017 
12 January: Public debate on abdication in the House of Representatives Budget committee.
11 May: A report of a joint committee of the National Diet recommends a one-off bill to facilitate the first imperial abdication in two centuries.
19 May: The Cabinet of Prime Minister Shinzō Abe introduces the abdication bill.
2 June: The abdication bill passes the House of Representatives (Lower House).
9 June: The abdication bill passes the House of Councillors (Upper House).
November: The Cabinet suggests that 30 April 2019 will be a good date.
1 December: The Imperial Household Council, which has not met in a quarter century, does so and approves the date suggested.
8 December: The Cabinet approves the date, authorizing the creation of an "imperial transition committee" to oversee the ceremonies involved, with Chief Cabinet Secretary Yoshihide Suga as chairman.

2018 
January: The committee meets for the first time.
20 February: Preliminary paper on official ceremonials issued stating that the abdication will be a state occasion.
3 April: White Paper on official ceremonials is issued by the committee.
23 December: The final celebration of the Akihito's birthday as emperor.

2019 
8 January: 30th Anniversary Jubilee begins with commemoration ceremonies for the Emperor Shōwa. Start of official farewell celebrations for Emperor Akihito.
14 February: A survey was listed out for suggestions about Naruhito's era name.
24 February: Jubilee celebrations at the National Theater.
25 February: The Imperial Household Agency announces that Akihito and Michiko's English titles upon abdication will be His Imperial Majesty The Emperor Emeritus and Her Imperial Majesty The Empress Emerita, respectively.
12 March: Traditional private abdication ceremonies and rituals began with the Kashikodokoro-ni-Taii-oyobi-sono-Kijitsu-Hōkoku-no-gi ceremony.
 in which Emperor Akihito reports his abdication to the sun goddess Amaterasu-ōmikami at the Kashiko-dokoro of the Three Palace Sanctuaries of the Imperial Palace.
 in which Imperial messengers and priests are sent to the Ise Grand Shrine, the mausoleum of Emperor Jimmu, and the mausoleums of the 4 most recent Emperors to report Emperor Akihito's abdication.
15 March: Traditional private abdication rituals.
 Imperial messengers and priests made offerings and reported Emperor Akihito's abdication at the Ise Grand Shrine.
 Imperial messengers and priests reported Emperor Akihito's abdication to the mausoleum of Emperor Jimmu, and the mausoleums of the 4 most recent Emperors.
26 March:  The Emperor and Empress paid respects at the mausoleum of Emperor Jimmu in Kashihara, Nara Prefecture.
18 April:  The Emperor and Empress pay respects at the Ise Grand Shrine in Ise, Mie Prefecture.
21 April: Local elections happen in Japan.
23 April:  The Emperor and Empress pay respects at the mausoleum of his late father, Emperor Shōwa, at the Musashi Imperial Graveyard in Hachiōji, Tokyo.
27 April: Extra Holiday: Start of Golden Week holiday season.
28 April: Extra Holiday
29 April: Shōwa Day
30 April:  Emperor Akihito announces his resignation from the throne and receives audience with the representatives of the people for the last time during a relatively brief ceremony in the Pine Hall (Matsu-no-Ma); the ceremony also featured two of the Three Sacred Treasures, and the Privy Seal and State Seal. Akihito becomes the first Jōkō since 1840. Heisei era comes to an end.
Reiwa Era
1 May: Beginning of the Reiwa era and accession date of Emperor Naruhito.
 Emperor Naruhito inherits two of the three Imperial Regalia of Japan, as well as the Privy Seal and State Seal. This ceremony also takes place in the Hall of Pines.
 in which Emperor Naruhito meets for the first time with the representatives of the people.
2 May: Extra Holiday
3 May: Constitution Memorial Day
4 May: Greenery Day
5 May: Children's Day
6 May: Extra Holiday: End of Golden Week Celebrations.
22 October: Enthronement Ceremony
 in which Emperor Naruhito proclaims the enthronement and receives felicitations from representatives of the people from at home and abroad.
22, 25, 29, 31 October:  Court banquets to celebrate the enthronement and receive congratulations from guests.
10 November (rescheduled from 22 October):  Procession to show and receive good wishes from the people by motor car.
14–15 November:

2020 
23 February: The first celebration of Naruhito's birthday as emperor.
8 November (rescheduled from 19 April): Fumihito, Prince Akishino was promoted to kōshi (a rank equivalent to crown prince).

Ceremonies 
The following table lists abdication and enthronement ceremonies in chronological order. Private ceremonies are listed as "Private". State acts are listed as "Public".

See also 
 Chrysanthemum taboo
 Daijō Tennō (retired Emperor)
 Enthronement of the Japanese emperor
 Imperial House of Japan
 Japanese era name
 List of emperors of Japan

References

External links 
Ceremonies and Rites related to the Imperial Succession (the Imperial Household Agency)
Ceremonies and Rites related to the Imperial Succession (the Cabinet Public Relations Office, Cabinet Secretariat)

Abdication
April 2019 events in Japan
Imperial House of Japan
2019 in Japanese politics
Japanese imperial history